Juan Carlos Vera Rivera (born 5 July 1960) is a Chilean former professional footballer who played as a attacking midfielder for clubs in Chile, Mexico and the United States.

Club career
Born in La Calera, Chile, in 1975 Vera moved to Spain and joined Rayo Vallecano youth system at the age of 15. He returned to Chile and played for Unión La Calera, where he made his professional debut, Audax Italiano and Huachipato.

In 1986 he moved to Mexico. He came to Morelia thanks of his former fellow in Unión La Calera, Marco Antonio Figueroa. In Morelia, he and his Chilean fellows Marco Antonio Figueroa and Ángel Bustos are well remembered as a prolific attacking trident. Along with Pumas UNAM, he won the 1990–91 Primera División, which is remembered as El Tucazo. In Mexico, he also played for Cruz Azul, Tampico Madero, Atlas and Pachuca.

After a step in the United States with DFW Toros, his last club was Unión La Calera in 1995, scoring one goal.

International career
He made an appearance for the Chile national team in a friendly match versus Mexico on 9 April 1991.

Personal life
After the 1973 Chilean coup d'état, he went alone to Spain in 1975. His family was made up by his father, a railway worker, his mother, a housekeeper, and his five siblings. All of them stayed in Chile.

When he was a player of Unión La Calera, he was nicknamed Pelé.

His first son was born in Mexico when he was a player of Morelia.

Following his retirement, he started a women's clothing factory along with his wife and they also have a guesthouse in Santiago, Chile, called The Fox Hostel. In addition, he has worked in football scouting, linking Chilean players with Mexican clubs.

Honours
Unión La Calera
 Segunda División de Chile: 1984

UNAM
 Primera División de México: 1990–91

References

External links
 
 Juan Carlos Vera at playmakerstats.com (English version of ceroacero.es)
 Juan Carlos Vera at PartidosdeLaRoja 

1960 births
Living people
People from Quillota Province
Chilean footballers
Chilean expatriate footballers
Chile international footballers
Association football midfielders
Unión La Calera footballers
Audax Italiano footballers
C.D. Huachipato footballers
Cruz Azul footballers
Atlético Morelia players
Tampico Madero F.C. footballers
Club Universidad Nacional footballers
Atlas F.C. footballers
C.F. Pachuca players
DFW Tornados players
Primera B de Chile players
Chilean Primera División players
Liga MX players
Ascenso MX players
USISL players
USL Second Division players
Chilean expatriate sportspeople in Spain
Chilean expatriate sportspeople in Mexico
Chilean expatriate sportspeople in the United States
Expatriate footballers in Spain
Expatriate footballers in Mexico
Expatriate soccer players in the United States